Lowlander is a 2000 album by Ed Miller.

Track listing
 In Your Heart, Home with You (Ian Davidson/Brian McNeill/Ed Miller) - 3:01
 Rivers and Reivers (traditional/Ed Miller) - 4:16
 Heather on the Moor (traditional) - 3:49
 Aye Waukin' O (Robert Burns) - 3:17
 The Prince of Darkness (B. McNeill/Ed Miller)- 5:23
 My Bonnie Border Lass (traditional/Ed Miller) - 3:31
 Cholesterol (Adam McNaughtan) - 3:50
 The Song of the Hammers (Brian McNeill) - 3:05
 More Than Just a Dram (Robin Laing) - 4:24
 The Effects of Whiskey (traditional, Arr. Miller & McNeill)- 3:36
 Road, Road (Brian McNeill) - 4:17
 The Lea Rig (Robert Burns) - 3:08
 Green Grows the Laurel (traditional, Arr. Miller & McNeill) - 3:26
 Lowlander (Brian McNeill) - 1:45

2000 albums
Ed Miller (Scottish folk musician) albums